Kate Micucci is an American actress and voice actress. In live action, she has appeared in the recurring role of Shelley in the Fox sitcom Raising Hope, and as Lucy in CBS's The Big Bang Theory. In voice acting, she is known for her roles in Steven Universe, DuckTales, Milo Murphy's Law, and as Velma Dinkley in various Scooby-Doo media beginning with 2015's Be Cool, Scooby-Doo!.

Filmography

Live action

Film

Television

Animation

Film

Television

Video games

Other credits

References

Actress filmographies
American filmographies